The McGill Journal of Sustainable Development Law (MJSDL) is a biannual peer-reviewed law journal published at the McGill University Faculty of Law and run solely by law students. The journal was established in 2005 as the McGill International Journal of Sustainable Development Law and Policy (MIJSDLP) by its founding editor-in-chief Michelle Toering Sanders. The Journal's current editor-in-chief is Arsalan Ahmed. The journal is edited by Dena Kia and Emma Sitland.

It covers legal issues pertaining to sustainable development and environmental law.

The Australian Research Council (ARC) ranked the McGill Journal of Sustainable Development Law among the best English-language law journals in the world giving it an A rating - a rating shared by only 165 law reviews globally out of 1,265 law journals.

References

External links 
 

Sustainability journals
2005 establishments in Quebec
Canadian law journals
McGill University
Multilingual journals
Law journals edited by students
Publications established in 2005